David Crawley (born 20 June 1977 in Dundalk, Ireland) is an Irish retired football player who played for Dundalk and Shelbourne during a 12-year-long League of Ireland career. Crawley was played a left back.

Career
Born in Dundalk, County Louth, Crawley began his senior career on the books at Manchester City for a short spell before returning to his hometown club Dundalk in 1997. He won the First Division with Dundalk in 2001 and he captained the Louth club to their FAI Cup success over Bohemians in 2002. He was also a member of Shelbourne's highly successful 2003, 2004 and 2006 League of Ireland Premier Division title winning sides. However, he only appeared 4 times in the league during the latter of those successes. Crawley was out of contract at the end of the 2006 season and as a result in 2007 he rejoined his hometown club  who were now in the First Division and were aiming to return to Ireland's top flight. It was not until the following season in 2008 that Crawley played an integral role in Dundalk's First Division title winning squad after pipping Shelbourne in a dramatic final night of that season. Despite this success, Crawley was released by Dundalk at the end of the 2008 season. Ironically, Crawley rejoined Shelbourne in January 2009 with the aim of winning his second successive First Division title. He made 30 league and cup appearances scoring one goal in his second spell at Shelbourne as he finished a First Division runner-up with Shels as they once again just missed out on promotion to the Premier Division.

Following the end of the 2009 season, Crawley called time on his successful football career to play Gaelic football for Seán O'Mahony's club in Dundalk.

Honours
League of Ireland Premier Division: 3
 Shelbourne - 2003, 2004, 2006
League of Ireland First Division: 2
 Dundalk - 2000–01, 2008
FAI Cup: 1
 Dundalk - 2002

References

External links
David Crawley's profile at www.shelbournefc.com

1977 births
Living people
Gaelic footballers who switched code
People from Dundalk
Association footballers from County Louth
Republic of Ireland association footballers
League of Ireland players
Shelbourne F.C. players
Dundalk F.C. players
Manchester City F.C. players
Association football defenders